is a Japanese footballer who plays as a midfielder and currently play for  club, FC Imabari.

Career
Raised by Nagano Parceiro youth ranks, Arai even had the chance of featuring for Japan's U-15 and U-16. Even while attending Nagano High School, Shonan Bellmare chose him as a special designated player since April 2017, before seeing him joining the top team the successive year.

Following loans to Gainare Tottori and Fukushima United FC in the J3 League between 2020 and 2022.

On 16 December 2022, Arai transferred to FC Imabari for the upcoming 2023 season.

Career statistics

Club
.

Club

References

External links

Profile at J. League

1999 births
Living people
Association football people from Nagano Prefecture
Japanese footballers
J1 League players
J3 League players
Shonan Bellmare players
Gainare Tottori players
Fukushima United FC players
FC Imabari players
Association football midfielders